Joel Joshua Frederick Melvin "Jobi" McAnuff (born 9 November 1981) is a former footballer. He was predominantly a winger but he has also played as an occasional central midfielder. Since his retirement he has worked as a Pundit.

He began his career at Wimbledon, making over 100 appearances for the club before brief spells at West Ham United and Cardiff City. McAnuff joined Crystal Palace in 2005, spending two years there before moving again, this time to Watford before joining Reading in 2009. He was appointed captain in 2011 and went on to make over 200 appearances in all competition for the Royals. Prior to Reading's promotion to the Premier League in 2011–12 he had spent his entire career playing in England's second tier, amassing over 400 league appearances. He joined Leyton Orient in 2014.

Born in London, McAnuff has represented Jamaica, his father's country of birth, at international level. He made his debut in May 2002 although his next appearance did not come until nearly eleven years later in February 2013. He was part of their squads which won the 2014 Caribbean Cup and competed at the 2015 Copa América.

Club career

Early career
Born in Edmonton, London, McAnuff made his professional debut in the 2001–02 season with First Division side Wimbledon. He played 104 games and scored 15 goals for the club, staying until Wimbledon's last season, 2003–04. In March 2003, Portsmouth manager Harry Redknapp agreed a deal to bring McAnuff and teammate Nigel Reo-Coker to the south coast club in preparation for their first Premiership season. Financial problems resulted in the player remaining at Wimbledon despite having already signed contracts with Portsmouth.

In the January 2004 transfer window, with Wimbledon now in administration, West Ham manager Alan Pardew signed McAnuff for West Ham United joining fellow former Wimbledon players, Nigel Reo-Coker, and Adam Nowland. He played only 14 games for the club, scoring 1 goal against Crewe. To generate funds for future transfers Pardew was forced to sell McAnuff and on 12 August 2004 he joined Cardiff City for a fee of £250,000 and was a virtual ever-present in his first year at the club. He made his debut against Ipswich Town, scoring his first goal against his former side West Ham United during a 4–1 win. He played 48 games and scored 3 goals and picked up numerous player of the month awards.  With Cardiff in financial difficulty, McAnuff left the club at the end of the 2004–05 season to join Crystal Palace for a fee of around £600,000.

Crystal Palace
In his first season at Selhurst Park, McAnuff played 43 games and scored eight goals. His performances in the Championship understandably led to interest from a number of clubs and in the summer of 2006 being linked with moves to Watford, Bolton Wanderers and Charlton Athletic, the latter managed by his former boss at Palace Iain Dowie.  However, it was announced during the summer 2006 transfer window that he would stay at Crystal Palace, and play for the Eagles under new boss Peter Taylor.

Watford
After a less successful 2006–07 campaign, McAnuff moved to Watford in June 2007 in a deal worth an initial £1.75 million.

McAnuff endured a slow start to his Watford career and found himself out of the side for the early part of the season due to the loan arrival of young Middlesbrough winger Adam Johnson. After Johnson's loan ended prematurely in November, McAnuff returned to the side and scored two important goals – the winner away at Sheffield Wednesday and a last minute long-distance strike to save a point at home to Cardiff City.

Reading

McAnuff joined Reading on 27 August 2009, then managed by former Watford boss Brendan Rodgers, on a three-year contract for an undisclosed fee. He made his debut against his former club Watford on 26 September 2009 with his first goal coming a month later in a 3–1 win over Coventry City on 31 October.

He scored the third goal against Cardiff City in the 2011 play-off semi-final with a storming run, sealing a 3–0 victory and sending Reading to Wembley for the final against Swansea City. McAnuff started in the final and provided assists for both Reading goals but was unable to prevent them losing the game 4 – 2. Ivar Ingimarsson and Matt Mills both left the club in the months following the play-off final defeat and on 13 July 2011, days after extending his contract until 2014, McAnuff was named as the new Reading captain. On being named captain he paid tribute to his predecessors and described it as a "massive honour".

The 2012–13 season saw McAnuff playing in the Premier League for the first time in his twelve-year career. By 27 November he had laid on four goals for his teammates, lying joint third in the league assists table. He had to wait until February for his first goal of the season, scoring in Reading's 2–1 FA Cup fifth round defeat to Manchester United at Old Trafford.

He left the club at the end of the 2013–14 season. McAnuff gave an exclusive interview to Get Reading saying he is fine over not getting a renewed contract, though he went on to say: "My time at Reading has been fantastic. It's been a thoroughly enjoyable chapter of my life, a stable one as well. Five seasons is a large chunk of my career. I've captained the club with massive amounts of pride and enjoyment. I've had many great times, the Championship win obviously, and also some bad ones as well. But it's been a fantastic experience. It's a time of my career I'll never forget."

Leyton Orient
On 25 July 2014, McAnuff signed a two-year deal with League One side Leyton Orient. In May 2016, he was released from Leyton Orient when it was announced that he would not be retained when his contract expired.

Minnesota United FC
McAnuff began trialing with Minnesota United FC of the North American Soccer League in June 2016. McAnuff made an appearance for Minnesota United in an international friendly against Liga MX side Club León on 25 June 2016 in the first ever football match at Target Field.

Stevenage
On 19 July 2016 McAnuff signed for League Two team Stevenage on a free transfer.

Return to Leyton Orient
On 20 July 2017, it was announced that McAnuff would return to Leyton Orient. He captained the side in the 2018–19 season and went on to win the league title. He later signed a further contract extension and moved into a player/coach role.

He was made interim manager of Leyton Orient on 28 February 2021 following the sacking of Ross Embleton He retired from playing at the end of the 2020–21 season. He was released from his management duties and left the club on 8 May 2021.

International career
Born in England, McAnuff qualifies to play for Jamaica through his Jamaican born father. He made his international debut on 18 May 2002 in the 'Unity Cup', an exhibition game against Nigeria at Loftus Road, coming on as a substitute in the 55th minute replacing Omar Daley. On 24 January 2013, more than ten years after he won his first cap, McAnuff was called up to the Jamaica squad to face Mexico on 7 February alongside fellow Reading players Adrian Mariappa and Garath McCleary. He started the game and helped Jamaica to a 0–0 draw in the Estadio Azteca. McAnuff was in the Jamaican squad which won the 2014 Caribbean Cup on home soil, scoring in the penalty shootout following their goalless draw against Trinidad and Tobago in the final in Montego Bay. At the 2016 Copa América held in the United States he made appearances in all 3 of Jamaica's group games.

Career statistics

Club

International

International goals
As of match played 29 March 2016. Jamaica score listed first, score column indicates score after each McAnuff goal.

Managerial statistics

Honours

Reading
Football League Championship: 2011–12

Leyton Orient
National League: 2018–19
FA Trophy runner-up: 2018–19

Jamaica
Caribbean Cup: 2014

Individual
Sir Tom Finney Award: 2022
National League Team of the Year: 2018–19

References

External links

Jobi McAnuff profile at Reading F.C.

1981 births
Living people
Footballers from Edmonton, London
Black British sportsmen
English people of Jamaican descent
English footballers
Jamaican footballers
Jamaica international footballers
Association football midfielders
Wimbledon F.C. players
West Ham United F.C. players
Cardiff City F.C. players
Crystal Palace F.C. players
Watford F.C. players
Reading F.C. players
Leyton Orient F.C. players
Premier League players
English Football League players
2014 Caribbean Cup players
2015 Copa América players
2015 CONCACAF Gold Cup players
Copa América Centenario players
Stevenage F.C. players
National League (English football) players
Leyton Orient F.C. managers
Jamaican football managers
English football managers
English Football League managers